Euthria cornea, common name : the spindle euthria, is a species of sea snail, a marine gastropod mollusk in the family Buccinidae, the true whelks.

Fossil reports
The fossil record of this species dates back to the Miocene (age range: from 11.608 to 7.246  million years ago). These fossils have been found in Italy.

Description
The shell size of Euthria cornea varies between 20 mm and 80 mm. This mollusk has a robust fusiform shell, with a sharp apex. The opening is oval, wide, with slight striae. The horny operculum is oval. The coloration of the shell is quite variable, with irregular dark spots on a brownish-gray background. The mollusk is orange. This predatory species mainly feeds on small bivalves, opening slightly the valves with the strong foot and sucking the tissues.

Distribution and habitat
This species occurs in the Atlantic Ocean off Portugal and Morocco and in the Mediterranean Sea. It can be found at depths of 5 to 30 m, mainly on rocky substrates.

References

 Lamarck J.B. (1816). Liste des objets représentés dans les planches de cette livraison. In: Tableau encyclopédique et méthodique des trois règnes de la Nature. Mollusques et Polypes divers. Agasse, Paris. 16 pp.
 Gofas, S.; Le Renard, J.; Bouchet, P. (2001). Mollusca, in: Costello, M.J. et al. (Ed.) (2001). European register of marine species: a check-list of the marine species in Europe and a bibliography of guides to their identification. Collection Patrimoines Naturels, 50: pp. 180–213
 Brunetti M.M. & Della Bella G. (2016). Revisioni di alcuni generi della famiglia Buccinidae Rafinesque, 1815 nel Plio-Pleistocene del Bacino Mediterraneo, con descrizione di tre nuove specie. Bollettino Malacologico. 52: 3-37

External links
 Xenophora
 
  Linnaeus, C. (1758). Systema Naturae per regna tria naturae, secundum classes, ordines, genera, species, cum characteribus, differentiis, synonymis, locis. Editio decima, reformata [10th revised edition, vol. 1: 824 pp. Laurentius Salvius: Holmiae.]
 Risso, A. (1826-1827). Histoire naturelle des principales productions de l'Europe Méridionale et particulièrement de celles des environs de Nice et des Alpes Maritimes. Paris, Levrault:. . 3(XVI): 1-480, 14 pls
 Locard A. (1886). Prodrome de malacologie française. Catalogue général des mollusques vivants de France. Mollusque marins. Lyon, H. Georg & Paris, Baillière : pp. X + 778
 Monterosato T. A. (di) (1884). Nomenclatura generica e specifica di alcune conchiglie mediterranee. Palermo, Virzi, 152 pp

Buccinidae
Gastropods described in 1758
Taxa named by Carl Linnaeus